Larrikin is an Australian English term meaning "a mischievous young person, an uncultivated, rowdy but good hearted person", or "a person who acts with apparent disregard for social or political conventions".

In the 19th and early 20th centuries, the term generally meant  "a lout, a hoodlum" or "a young urban rough, a hooligan", meanings which became obsolete.

Etymology 

The word larrikin was a dialect term meaning "mischievous or frolicsome youth" originating from the West Midlands region of England (particularly the counties of Worcestershire and Warwickshire).  It was also related to the verb to larrack in the Yorkshire dialect, meaning 'to lark about'.  While larrikin eventually fell into disuse in its place of origin, the word started to become widely used in the streets of Melbourne from the late 1860s.

The term larrikin was reported in an English dialect dictionary in 1905, referring to 'a mischievous or frolicsome youth'. The word lupikin, from Scottish Gaelic , in the Cromarty Fisherfolk dialect, meaning 'scoundrel', is unlikely to be cognate.

Evolution of larrikin culture 

As larrikin increasingly began to be used by journalists in their reports of Melbourne street life during the 1870s, the word spread to other localities in Australia and New Zealand and was rapidly established as a colonial word.  However, the colonial concept of a 'larrikin' had a harder edge than its original English dialect usage.  Larrikins were aged from about eleven years to their early twenties, most commonly in their mid-to-late teens.  They were mostly from poor backgrounds, earning a precarious living from low-status work or petty crime, with a characteristic streetwise brashness. A letter to the editor of the Geelong Advertiser in November 1870, complaining of the "larrikin nuisance" on the market reserve in Geelong, described the typical behaviour of larrikins as engaging in "rows and fights", obstructing the footpath and employing "the foulest and most blasphemous language, frequently to passers-by".

Commentators have noted the larrikin streak in Australian culture, and have theorised about its origins. Some say that larrikinism arose as a reaction to corrupt, arbitrary authority during Australia's convict era, or as a reaction to norms of propriety imposed by officials from Britain on the young country. The term was used to describe members of the street gangs that operated in Sydney at the time, for example the Rocks Push – a criminal gang in The Rocks in Sydney during the late 19th and early 20th centuries – who were noted for their antisocial behaviour and gang-specific dress codes. In the late 19th century, one Melbourne newspaper, the Leader, claimed that police records showed nearly all the larrikins were the product of Catholic schools.

An October 1947 editorial in The Australian Women's Weekly equated larrikinism with vandalism including arson, "They are the people who leave their picnic fires smouldering, and start blazes that deal the final blow to green loveliness", and defacing monuments, "A similar larrikin streak sends louts into city parks to shy stones at monuments and chip noses off statuary".

Affectionate colloquial usage

Australian vernacular speech commonly inverts a word-meaning ironically to a diametrical opposite, e.g, nicknaming a red-haired person as "Bluey". In similar fashion highly derogatory terms such as "bastard" and "larrikin" are frequently deployed with affectionate, even respectful connotations. For example, in 
1965 Australian swimmer Dawn Fraser was banned from competition by the Australian Swimming Union for various incidents at the previous year's Summer Olympics. Fraser was later described as having a "larrikin streak" as well as being an "iconic figure", and was appointed an Officer of the Order of Australia in 1988.

The evolution of larrikinism in Australia is summarised in the publisher's description of a 2012 book by Melissa Bellanta, Larrikins: A History:

It can be argued that the larrikin tradition of disdain for authority, propriety and the often conservative norms of bourgeois Australia (as evident, for example, in the country's history of censorship and the nation's receptiveness to paternalistic leaders) are two sides of a self-reinforcing dynamic; the social conservatism of the mainstream fuels the undercurrent of larrikinism and rebellion, which, in turn, is seen as demonstrating that a firm hand is needed. This is sometimes referred to as the "larrikin-wowser nexus", "wowser" being an Australian colloquial term for a person of puritanical mores.

Larrikinism in wartime 

When the First World War broke out, larrikinism became closely connected to diggers (Australian soldiers), and remains part of the Anzac legend. The notion of larrikinism acquired positive meaning and it became a term of admiration. Indiscipline within the AIF (Australian Imperial Force) was often portrayed as harmless larrikinism that continued in folklore and anecdote. "After the armistice the larrikin digger characters were increasingly celebrated as quintessentially Australian. The idea that the real Australian was a bit of a larrikin crystallized."

Female larrikins 
While larrikinism was defined during the colonial era mainly "as a problem of male violence", females were also present among larrikin gangs. Colonial larrikin girls could be just as vulgar as larrikin boys; some of the girls even took pleasure in exhibiting masculine qualities. A supportive female subculture emerged in Melbourne. Women rejected by the rest of the society lived together and called themselves mates. Supportive relationships were found among girls sent to industrial schools or reformatories, for example Biloela Industrial School. These girls often engaged in violent behaviour, smashed windows, sang songs with obscene lyrics and had no desire to become "respectable" women.

See also
 Australian English
 Bogan
 Ocker
 Wowser

References

Further reading
 Duffy, Michael; Moore, Tony The triumph of the larrikin? Discussion transcript at ABC Radio National, 24 October 2011. (Click on "show transcript" near page head.)

Australian fringe and underground culture
Working class in Australia